Fishcombe Cove is a small shingle beach on the south-west coast of England, on the outskirts of Brixham. The beach is surrounded by woodland, and an entrance to Churston Woods is located above Fishcombe Cove. It is important for its eelgrass beds, breeding grounds for native seahorses. It is on the South West Coast Path.

References 

Beaches of Devon
Coves of Devon
Brixham